Krazy Fest (originally stylized as Krazy✻Fest!) was an American music festival hosted in Louisville, Kentucky. It ran annually from 1998–2003, with a one-off comeback in 2011. The first three editions were held during Memorial Day Weekend in mid-late May. From 2001–2003, it was held between mid-June to early August.  

The event was first organized by Scott Ritcher (then-vocalist of Metroschifter) and Andy Rich, both co-owners the emotional hardcore record label Initial Records, in partnership with Jason Noble, then-vocalist of Shipping News, and Mark Brickey, then-vocalist of The Enkindels. Noble and Brickey were also involved with Initial Records in various functions. Ryan Patterson, senior vice-president of Initial Records, came on board in 2001. As such, the festival principally showcased emotional hardcore bands (including many signed to Initial Records), but also included melodic hardcore, post-hardcore, punk rock, hardcore punk, metalcore and indie rock acts.    

While in its seventh year's planning in early 2004, Patterson announced to the press that the festival would be postponed from its usual spring or summer date to later in the fall. Patterson stated that the issue rose from the lack of availability of headlining bands and the increased cost of getting bands to play the festival. Initial Records also became defunct around the same time. In late 2004, a VHS/DVD of Krazy Fest 4 and 5 was announced but never released.

After receiving Rich's blessing in 2010, new promoter Andrew Tinsley (formerly of Endpoint) brought back Krazy Fest for Memorial Day Weekend in 2011. Tinsley hoped to bring back the festival in 2012 but was unable to due to scheduling conflicts.

Krazy Fest lineups by year

May 29–31, 1998: Krazy✻Fest! 

Location: Brewery Thunderdome.

Notes: The festival was originally to take place at Stage Door Johnnies in Louisville, Kentucky, but it was moved to the Brewery Thunderdome. The split CD between Metroschifter and Shipping News was released at the event. Due to an electrical storm and a subsequent power outage on the evening of Sunday May 31st, headlining bands Superchunk and Shipping News were not able to perform. Two bands did not perform on Saturday May 30th due to one breaking up and another breaking down in Pennsylvania; one of the bands that played on Friday May 29th was asked to play a second set on Saturday to compensate.

Friday May 29th

 Apocalypse Hoboken
 Grade
 Silent Majority
 The Enkindels
 The Suicide Machines

Saturday May 30th 

 Automatic
 BoySetsFire
 Buried Alive
 Coalesce
 Converge
 Speak 714
 Snapcase
 Ten Yard Fight
 Today Is the Day
 Torn Apart

Sunday May 31st

 Elliott
 Empire State Games
 Jejune
 King for a Day
 Metroschifter
 Shipping News
 Superchunk
 Uzeda

May 21–23, 1999: Krazy✻Fest 1999! 

Location: The Belvedere.

Notes: Cave In did not perform due to a van fire earlier in its tour. Ink & Dagger was scheduled to perform, but did not show up.

Friday May 21st 

 H2O
 Kill Your Idols
 Out
 The Enkindels
 The Get Up Kids
 Saves the Day

Saturday May 222nd 

 Braid
 Buried Alive
 Burn It Down
 Cave In
 Fastbreak
 Jejune
 My Own Victim
 Shai Hulud
 Sick of It All
 Silent Majority
 Snapcase
 Zao

Sunday May 23rd 

 Elliott
 Jimmy Eat World
 Le Shok
 Metroschifter
 Red Sun
 Sarge
 Shipping News
 The Jazz June
 Victory at Sea

May 19–21, 2000: Krazy Fest 3 K2K 

Location: The Belvedere. 

Notes: In addition to Initial Records, the festival was also sponsored by eMusic. The Dillinger Escape Plan vocalist Dimitri Minakakis injured audience members by swinging his microphone chord during the band's set and hitting people in the face with the microphone. The festival was announced as By the Grace of God's final show, though the band would perform one more show at the BRYCC House a few weeks later.

Friday May 19th 

 BoySetsFire
 Burn It Down
 River City High
 Skam Impaired
 The Enkindels
 The Suicide Machines

Saturday May 20th 

 AFI
 As Friends Rust
 Brother's Keeper
 Cave In
 Drowningman
 Grade
 One King Down
 Reach the Sky
 Saves the Day
 The Dillinger Escape Plan
 The National Acrobat
 Time in Malta

Sunday May 21st 

 Buried Alive
 By the Grace of God
 Good Clean Fun
 Hot Rod Circuit
 King for a Day
 Moods for Moderns
 Stretch Arm Strong
 The Jazz June
 The Juliana Theory
 The Movielife

July 27–29, 2001: Krazy Fest 4 

Location: Louisville Water Tower.

Notes: The Dillinger Escape Plan played with special guest vocalist Sean Ingram.

Friday July 27th 

 Avail
 Pflanz
 Holy Angels
 Hot Water Music
 Planes Mistaken for Stars
 Small Brown Bike
 The Story So Far

Saturday July 28th 

 American Nightmare
 Bane
 Blood Red
 Botch
 Burnt by the Sun
 BoySetsFire
 Christiansen
 Converge
 Ensign
 Harkonen
 Poison the Well
 Stretch Arm Strong
 The Dillinger Escape Plan
 The Hope Conspiracy

Sunday July 29th 

 Alkaline Trio
 Dashboard Confessional
 Elliott
 Fairweather
 Further Seems Forever
 Hey Mercedes
 Hot Rod Circuit
 Saves the Day
 The Jazz June
 The White Octave

June 21–23, 2002: Krazy Fest 5 

Location: Louisville Waterfront Park.

Notes: Planes Mistaken for Stars and The Jazz June were booked for the festival but cancelled their appearances in May 2002. Planes Mistaken for Stars was replaced by Most Precious Blood. Drowningman was originally scheduled to perform on Friday June 21st but it was moved to Saturday June 22nd.

Friday June 21st 

 Bane
 Reach the Sky
 Sick of It All
 Snapcase
 Stretch Arm Strong
 The Hope Conspiracy

Saturday June 22nd 

 AFI
 As Friends Rust
 Black Widows
 Blood Red
 Converge
 Corn on Macabre
 Drowningman
 From Autumn to Ashes
 Most Precious Blood
 NORA
 The Dillinger Escape Plan
 The Glasspack
 Tiger Army

Sunday June 23rd 

 Cadillac Blindside
 Christiansen
 Elliott
 Milemarker
 Onelinedrawing
 Small Brown Bike
 The Reputation
 The Rocking Horse Winner
 Thursday
 Ultimate Fakebook

August 1–3, 2003: Krazyfest 6 

Location: Louisville Waterfront Park.

Notes: The Beautiful Mistake was booked to play on Friday August 1st but cancelled their appearances in July 2003; the band was replaced by Elliott.

Friday August 1st 

 A Static Lullaby
 Blue Sky Mile
 Elliott
 Midtown
 Reggie and the Full Effect
 This Day Forward
 Ultimate Fakebook

Saturday August 2nd 

 Andrew W.K.
 Anodyne
 Atreyu
 Black Cross
 Burnt by the Sun
 Every Time I Die
 Hatebreed
 Hopesfall
 Mastodon
 Planes Mistaken for Stars
 Playing Enemy
 Terror
 The Blood Brothers
 The Hope Conspiracy
 The Locust
 The Suicide File
 Throwdown
 With Honor

Sunday August 3rd 

 Armor for Sleep
 Dillinger Four
 Bear vs. Shark
 Cave In
 Christiansen
 Fairweather
 Helicopter Helicopter
 Hey Mercedes
 Paint It Black
 Recover
 Roy
 Rye Coalition
 Sense Field
 The Bouncing Souls
 The Explosion
 The Jazz June
 The Reputation

May 20–22, 2011: Krazy Fest 2011 

Location: Expo Five.

Notes: The 2011 come-back event was the first to include more than one stage; the bands were split onto three stages.

Friday May 20th

Stage A 

 Against Me!
 Bane
 By the Grace of God
 Chamberlain
 Lions Lions
 Moving Mountains
 Xerxes

Stage B 

 End of a Year
 Kevin Seconds
 Reading Group
 Small Brown Bike
 Strike Anywhere
 The Bled
 Tigers Jaw

Saturday May 21st

Stage A 

 7 Seconds
 Anti-Flag
 Cave In
 Dead End Path
 Evolett
 Fireworks
 Hot Water Music
 Lemuria
 Pianos Become the Teeth

Stage B 

 Disembodied
 La Dispute
 Make Do and Mend
 Title Fight
 Touché Amoré

Stage C 

 Another Mistake
 Defeater
 Former Thieves
 Hostage Calm
 Native

Sunday May 22nd

Stage A 

 Coalesce
 Hot Rod Circuit
 I Hate Our Freedom
 Lucero
 Onelinedrawing
 The Bouncing Souls
 This Is Hell

Stage B 

 Ensign
 Frontier(s)
 Samiam

Stage C 

 A Great Big Pile of Leaves
 Dave Hause
 Daytrader
 Straight A's

References

1998 establishments in Kentucky
Festivals in Louisville, Kentucky
Heavy metal festivals in the United States
Music festivals disestablished in 2011
Music festivals established in 1998
Music festivals in Kentucky
Music organizations based in the United States
Punk rock festivals
Rock festivals in the United States